Laura Plantation is a restored historic Louisiana Creole plantation on the west bank of the Mississippi River near Vacherie, Louisiana, (U.S.), open for guided tours. Formerly known as Duparc Plantation, it is significant for its early 19th-century Créole-style raised big house and several surviving outbuildings, including two slave cabins.  It is one of only 15 plantation complexes in Louisiana with this many complete structures. Because of its historical importance, the plantation is on the National Register of Historic Places.  The site, in St. James Parish, Louisiana, is also included on the Louisiana African American Heritage Trail.

Alcée Fortier, who later became Professor of Romance Languages and folklore at Tulane University, was said to have collected Louisiana Creole versions of the West African Br'er Rabbit stories here in the 1870s.

The parents and family of U.S. singer-songwriter Fats Domino ("Blueberry Hill") had lived on the plantation.

History
In the early 1700s, a large Colapissa village called Tabiscanja, meaning "long river view," was located on high ground above the Mississippi River in this area. In 1785, Acadian refugees settled on the site.

In 1804, the Frenchman Guillaume Duparc, a naval veteran from the American Revolutionary War, had petitioned then-President Thomas Jefferson, for land. Jefferson secured Duparc's loyalty to the U.S., which had just acquired additional territory through the Louisiana Purchase, by granting him land along the Mississippi River. Considering the natives to be Frenchmen, the French did not force them off the riverlands. Instead, the Colapissa continued to live on the rear part of the plantation until 1915.

Duparc's slaves built his plantation house during 1804 and 1805. The house had a U-shape, with the two back wings around a central courtyard. A detached kitchen building in the back, separate to protect the main house from fire and keep it cooler in summer. The plantation size, wings of the manor house, and outbuildings have changed over the years since the original plantation house completed in 1805.

The sugar mill was located about  behind the big house, surrounded by sugarcane fields.

In the years before the American Civil War, the slave quarters included a slave infirmary, 69 cabins, communal kitchens, and several water wells located along the road. Each slave cabin was occupied by two families, who had separate doors and shared a central double fireplace. Near each cabin they kept a vegetable garden plus a chicken coop and/or pigpen. By the time of the Civil War, there were 186 slaves working the farm. The DuParc Plantation exported commodity crops of indigo, rice, pecans, and sugar cane.

The complex continued operating as a plantation into the 20th century. The two back wings of the manor house were removed, widening the back balcony, and a back kitchen wing was added off the back porch. The remaining plantation complex consists of the "big house" with several outbuildings, including six original slave quarters, and a maison de reprise (a second house, or mother-in-law cottage). The existence of the slave quarters, where farm workers continued to live until 1977, contributes to the historic significance of the complex. Because of its importance, it has been listed on the U.S. National Register of Historic Places. The complex is used to interpret history and for heritage tourism.

Architecture 

Shaded by the low branches of large oak trees, the main house is almost hidden from the road. Constructed in 1804–1805, the "big house" at Laura Plantation has a raised brick basement story and a briquette-entre-poteaux (brick between posts) upper floor. Much of the house was pre-fabricated, as its wooden beams were pre-cut off-site and arrived ready to be installed. It is one of only 30 substantial Créole raised houses in the state. Also noteworthy are the Federal-style interior woodwork and Norman roof truss, unusual for later Créole houses.

The floor plan consists of two rows of five rooms that all open directly into each other without any hallways. The interior of the "big house" is furnished with original antiques. Some pieces were donated to the plantation by families of the original owners.  Owners have left some areas inside the home unrestored to give visitors a sense of history and show wall-construction methods.

A large collection of family treasures and some items of apparel are on display, giving a sense of daily life.  Laura Locoul Gore's memoir, Memories of the Old Plantation Home, provided much of what is known about life on Laura Plantation. The gift shop has displayed some books about the area and related subjects.

Intereor

Fire of 2004 

On August 9, 2004, the plantation house was significantly damaged by an electrical fire which destroyed 80% of the house, including the kitchen wing behind the house.  The left half of the house survived, but even the elevated foundation of the right side was burned. Restoration work was completed in 2006, despite the interruption of Hurricane Katrina in August 2005. The ashes of the kitchen wing were cleared, but the back wing was not rebuilt. Instead, the back corners of the house were capped with old gray boards to indicate where two back wings of the house had existed when Laura Locoul, the last DuParc descendant, sold the plantation in 1891.

Residents
The first owner, Guillaume Benjamin Demézière Duparc, lived at the plantation for 4 years, dying in 1808, 3 years after the house was completed. His daughter Elisabeth married into the Locoul family. Generations later, Laura Locoul Gore, who was born in the big house in 1861, inherited the plantation after she had married and moved to New Orleans. Her memoir was published posthumously in 2000. 
A local historian wrote about her ancestors of the early nineteenth century in Louisiana:
On October 25, 1821, Elisabeth Duparc, a native of Pointe Coupée and the daughter of the late Guillaume Benjamin Demézière Duparc and Anne Nanette Prudhomme, was married at the St. John the Baptist Catholic Church in Edgard to George Raymond Locoul, a native of Bordeaux, France, the son of Raymond Locoul and Marie Roland. From this marriage, the lands of Duparc, which is presently represented by Laura Plantation at the river, became the property of the Locouls. One member, Marie Elisabeth Aimée Locoul, the widow of Jean Flavien Charles de Lobel Mahy, the granddaughter of Guillaume Duparc, subdivided the Duparc tract from the river to 

After inheriting the plantation, Laura Locoul Gore became its fourth mistress. She ran the plantation as a sugar cane business until 1891, when she sold it to Aubert Florian Waguespack. The Waguespack family ran, resided on, and lived at the plantation for nearly another century, until 1984.

The Brer Rabbit and Br'er Fox tales recounted in Louisiana and the South are variations on traditional stories that originated in Senegal and were brought by enslaved Senegalese to America around the 1720s as part of their culture. According to the plantation's history, Alcée Fortier, a neighbor of the family and student of folklore, visited there in the 1870s to listen to the freedmen.  He collected the stories, which freedmen told their children in the Louisiana Creole language that had developed since colonial times. It was a creole language based in French and absorbing African languages. These stories were about Compair Lapin and Compair Bouki (the clever rabbit and stupid fool), in which the rabbit plays a traditional trickster role. Twenty-five years later in 1894, Fortier published stories which he had collected and translated in the edition Louisiana Folk Tales: In French Dialect and English Translation. Fortier may have collected some of the tales at Laura Plantation and his own family's plantation.

In the late 20th century, Laura Plantation's association with Fortier's Br'er Rabbit tales drew the attention of preservationist Norman Marmillion. He created a for-profit company to attract enough investors to embark on a ten-year plan of restoration of the plantation. Some investors are descendants of former owners.

See also
Whitney Plantation
Rural African American Museum, Opelousas

References

 Sources
 Speakman, Stephanie (September 20, 1998). World of the Bayou and the Plantation.
 Taylor, Delia (August 10, 1993). The Greater Baton Rouge Business Report.

External links

 LauraPlantation.com
 The Cultural Landscape Foundation/Laura Plantation
 Reid, Molly. "Creole Country: Laura Plantation Rises From the Ashes", The Times-Picayune, August 15, 2007

Slave cabins and quarters in the United States
Houses completed in 1820
Creole architecture in Louisiana
Pre-statehood history of Louisiana
Houses on the National Register of Historic Places in Louisiana
Louisiana African American Heritage Trail
Louisiana Creole culture
Sugar plantations in Louisiana
Historic house museums in Louisiana
Museums in St. James Parish, Louisiana
Senegalese-American history
Houses in St. James Parish, Louisiana
Historic districts on the National Register of Historic Places in Louisiana
Plantation houses in Louisiana
National Register of Historic Places in St. James Parish, Louisiana
1805 establishments in the Territory of Orleans